Arcanotherium is an extinct genus of early proboscidean belonging to the family Numidotheriidae that lived in north Africa during the late Eocene/early Oligocene interval.

Taxonomy
Arcanotherium was originally described by Court (1995) as a new species of Numidotherium, N. savagei, based on a mandible found in the late 1960s in late Eocene deposits at Dor el Talha, Libya. However, after the Barytherium material from Libya became accessible to paleontologists, undescribed material from the collection prompted Delmer (2009) to erect Arcanotherium for N. savagei.

References 

Eocene proboscideans
Prehistoric placental genera
Eocene mammals of Africa
Fossil taxa described in 2009